Erythradenia is a genus of flowering plants in the family Asteraceae.

There is only one known species, Erythradenia pyramidalis, endemic to Mexico (Guerrero, México State, Michoacán, Jalisco).

References

Monotypic Asteraceae genera
Endemic flora of Mexico
Eupatorieae